Yaskino is a rural locality (a village) in Staroselskoye Rural Settlement, Mezhdurechensky District, Vologda Oblast, Russia. The population was 11 as of 2002.

Geography 
Yaskino is located 31 km southwest of Shuyskoye (the district's administrative centre) by road. Novoye is the nearest rural locality.

References 

Rural localities in Mezhdurechensky District, Vologda Oblast